Oum Sahaouine (also written Oum Sahouine) is a village in the commune of El Oued, in El Oued District, El Oued Province, Algeria.

References

Neighbouring towns and cities

Populated places in El Oued Province